Facundo Cobos (born 19 February 1993) is an Argentine professional footballer who plays as a left-back for Argentine Primera División side Patronato.

Career
Cobos had a youth spell with Boca Juniors, playing once for them at the 2012 U-20 Copa Libertadores. He also had time with All Boys and Independiente Rivadavia. His senior career began with Gutiérrez of Torneo Federal B in 2014. He made fifteen appearances in season one, before featuring twenty-nine times and scoring twice in 2015 which was spent in Torneo Federal A following promotion in 2014. In January 2016, Cobos joined Argentine Primera División side Godoy Cruz. His debut came on 23 April during a 1–0 win vs. San Martín. In October 2017, Cobos scored his first professional goal in a home win over Gimnasia y Esgrima.

Patronato

Career statistics
.

References

External links

1993 births
Living people
Sportspeople from Mendoza Province
Argentine footballers
Argentine expatriate footballers
Association football fullbacks
Torneo Federal A players
Argentine Primera División players
Paraguayan Primera División players
Godoy Cruz Antonio Tomba footballers
Club Sol de América footballers
Club Atlético Patronato footballers
Argentine expatriate sportspeople in Paraguay
Expatriate footballers in Paraguay